Listen Without Prejudice may refer to:

 Listen Without Prejudice Vol. 1, a 1990 album by George Michael
 Listen Without Prejudice (Regine Velasquez album), a 1994 album by Regine Velasquez